Gautam Budha Wildlife Sanctuary (also spelled Gautam Buddha) is a wildlife sanctuary located in Gaya district of Bihar state and Koderma district of Jharkhand state in east-central India.

The refuge was established in 1976, and covers an area of 259 km2. Prior to becoming a wildlife refuge, the area was a private hunting reserve.

The refuge covers portions of the Lower Gangetic Plains moist deciduous forests and Chota Nagpur dry deciduous forests ecoregions. Plant communities include dry and moist sal (Shorea robusta) forests, ravine thorn forest, and tropical dry riverine forest.

Fauna include tigers, leopards, wolves, sloth bears, chitals, chinkaras, and many species of birds.

The sanctuary has a rest house. The refuge is 65 km southeast of Gaya, which has a railway station and airport.

References

Chota Nagpur dry deciduous forests
Lower Gangetic Plains moist deciduous forests
Wildlife sanctuaries in Bihar
Wildlife sanctuaries in Jharkhand
Tourist attractions in Gaya district
Hazaribagh district
Protected areas established in 1976
1976 establishments in Bihar